No. 9 Group RAF was a group of the Royal Air Force.

History

The group was first formed on 1 April 1918 in No. 2 Area. The next month it was transferred to South-Western Area and then disbanded on 15 May 1919.

Its next incarnation was as part of RAF Fighter Command. As 1940 wore on, the need for another Group headquarters to control fighter operations became more and more apparent. No. 9 Group was formed in September 1940 to cover north-west England and Northern Ireland. It was based at RAF Barton Hall and initially only controlled No. 308 Polish Fighter Squadron at RAF Speke, 

On 1 January 1941 the group was only using the Hurricane I:
 No. 96 Squadron RAF at RAF Cranage
 No. 229 Squadron RAF at RAF Speke
 No. 306 Polish Fighter Squadron at RAF Tern Hill
 No. 308 Polish Fighter Squadron at RAF Baginton
 No. 312 (Czechoslovak) Squadron RAF at RAF Speke

No. 275 Squadron RAF was formed at RAF Valley on 15 October 1941 as No. 9 Group's Air Sea Rescue unit, to cover the Irish Sea.

9 Group also supplied the staff that were trained by Robert Watson-Watt, the inventor of radar, to operate the Chain Home early warning system.  The staff being RAF females (they were never WAAF members).

On 1 May 1942 it consisted of:
 No. 131 Squadron RAF at RAF Llanbedr with Spitfire
 No. 232 Squadron RAF at RAF Atcham with Spitfire
 No. 255 Squadron RAF at RAF High Ercall with Beaufighter
 No. 257 Squadron RAF at RAF Honiley with Hurricane & Spitfire
 No. 315 Polish Fighter Squadron at RAF Woodvale with Spitfire

On 1 March 1943 it consisted of:
 No. 41 Squadron RAF at RAF High Ercall with Spitfire
 No. 96 Squadron RAF at RAF Honiley with Beaufighter
 No. 195 Squadron RAF at RAF Woodvale with Typhoon
 No. 219 Squadron RAF at RAF Scorton with Beaufighter
 No. 256 Squadron RAF at RAF Woodvale with Beaufighter
 No. 456 Squadron RAAF at RAF Valley with Beaufighter & Mosquito

No. 9 Group itself had a relative short lifespan. By 1944 it was predominantly a training formation.

On 6 June 1944 it comprised:
 two sector stations, RAF Honiley and RAF Woodvale,
 eight Operational Training Units:
 No. 13 Operational Training Unit at RAF Bicester and RAF Finmere with Mosquito & Boston
 No. 41 Operational Training Unit at RAF Hawarden and RAF Poulton with Mustang & Hurricane
 No. 42 Operational Training Unit at RAF Ashbourne and RAF Darley Moor with Whitley, Oxford, Anson & Albemarle
 No. 51 Operational Training Unit at RAF Cranfield and RAF Twinwood Farm with Mosquito
 No. 53 Operational Training Unit RAF at RAF Kirton-in-Lindsey, RAF Hibaldstow and RAF Caistor with Spitfire
 No. 54 Operational Training Unit at RAF Charterhall and RAF Winfield with Beaufighter
 No. 57 Operational Training Unit at RAF Eshott and RAF Boulmer with Spitfire
 No. 59 Operational Training Unit at RAF Boulmer with Hurricane & Typhoon
 No. 60 Operational Training Unit at RAF High Ercall with Mosquito
 No. 61 Operational Training Unit at RAF Rednal and RAF Montford Bridge with Spitfire
 No. 62 Operational Training Unit at RAF Ouston with Anson & Wellington
 three Tactical Exercise Units:
 No. 1 Tactical Exercise Unit at RAF Kinnell with Hurricane & Spitfire
 No. 2 Tactical Exercise Unit at RAF Grangemouth and RAF Balado Bridge with Spitfire
 No. 3 Tactical Exercise Unit at RAF Annan] with Typhoon & Spitfire
 AI Conversion Unit
 Fighter Leaders School RAF
 No. 2 Aircraft Delivery Flight
 No. 58 Repair and Salvage Unit
 three other support/supply units
 9 Group Communications Flight flying Hawker Hurricanes and Airspeed Oxfords from Samlesbury Aerodrome. 

It was absorbed into No. 12 Group RAF on 15 September 1944.

Commanders
The following officers had command of No. 9 Group:

1918 to 1919
1 April 1918 Brigadier-General H D Briggs

1940 to 1944
16 September 1940 Air Vice-Marshal W A McClaughry
April 1942 Air Vice-Marshal L H Slatter
26 June 1942 Air Vice-Marshal W F Dickson
1942 Air Commodore C R Steele (Temporary appointment)
10 November 1942 Air Vice-Marshal J W Jones
2 July 1943 Air Vice-Marshal L N Hollinghurst
6 November 1943 Air Commodore C A Stevens (Temporary appointment)
7 December 1943 Air Vice-Marshal D F Stevenson

See also
 List of Royal Air Force groups

References

Citations

Bibliography

 Smith, David J., Action Stations 3: Wales and the North-West., Cambridge, UK: Patrick Stephens Ltd, 1981. .

External links
Air of Authority - A History of RAF Organisation - Group No's 1 - 9

009
Military units and formations established in 1918
1918 establishments in the United Kingdom